Rock Stars Kill is a compilation of various artists released by Kill Rock Stars on September 1, 1994. The compilation was released simultaneously as a vinyl LP with accompanying 7″ single, cassette, and CD.

Track listing

LP
Side one
Tourettes – "Horse Girl"
Cupid Go-go mobile Club – "M.P. Skulkers"
Starpower – "Megablot"
Boredoms – "Pukulee & Rikulee"
Helium with The Bird of Paradise – "Puffin Stars"
Spinanes – "Stupid Crazy"
Team Dresch – "Seven"
Mukilteo Fairies – "We Are Not Your Entertainers"
Severed Lethargy – "Rev"

Side two
Rancid – "Brixton"
Free Kitten – "Feed the Tree"
Universal Order of Armageddon – "Painfully Obvious"
The Pee Chees – "Patty Coahulla"
Star Pimp – "Roche Limit"
Pell Mell – "Don the Beachcomber"
Smog – "37 Pushups"
Kathleen Hanna – "I Wish I Was Him (For Evan Dando)"

7″ single, side one
Star Sign Scorpio – "Eskinaut"
Hattifatteners – "North Pole"
Grouse Mountain Skyride – "Pretty Polly"

7″ single, side two
God Is My Co-Pilot – "Anatomically Correct"
Fifth Column – "Detoxkiller (Erotic Thriller)"
Fleabag – "Pusdog"

CD
Tourettes – "Horse Girl"
Cupid Go-go mobile Club – "M.P. Skulkers"
Starpower – "Megablot"
Boredoms – "Pukulee & Rikulee"
Helium with The Bird of Paradise – "Puffin Stars"
Spinanes – "Stupid Crazy"
Team Dresch – "Seven"
Mukilteo Fairies – "We Are Not Your Entertainers"
God Is My Co-Pilot – "Anatomically Correct"
Severed Lethargy – "Rev"
Rancid – "Brixton"
Free Kitten – "Feed the Tree"
Universal Order of Armageddon – "Painfully Obvious"
The Pee Chees – "Patty Coahuila:
Star Pimp – "Roche Limit"
Pell Mell – "Don the Beachcomber"
Smog – "37 Pushups"
Star Sign Scorpio – "Eskinaut"
Hattifatteners – "North Pole"
Grouse Mountain Skyride – "Pretty Polly"
Fifth Column – "Detox Killer (Erotic Thriller)"
Fleabag – "Pusdog"
Kathleen Hanna – "I Wish I Was Him"

References

External links
[  Allmusic review of Rock Stars Kill]

1994 compilation albums
Kill Rock Stars compilation albums
Alternative rock compilation albums
Record label compilation albums
Riot grrrl albums